The women's triple jump event at the 2003 IAAF World Indoor Championships was held on March 14–15.

Medalists

Results

Qualification
Qualifying perf. 14.20 (Q) or 8 best performers (q) advanced to the Final.

Final

References
Results
 Results

Triple
Triple jump at the World Athletics Indoor Championships
2003 in women's athletics